Matsumae is a Japanese surname. Notable people with the surname include:

, Japanese daimyō
, Japanese video game composer
, Japanese electrical engineer, inventor and politician
, Japanese daimyō
, Japanese daimyō

Fictional characters
, a character in the anime series Hanasaku Iroha

Japanese-language surnames